Christopher Fettes (born 1937) is an English former teacher, farmer and founder of the Irish Green Party.  He is an honorary member of the International Vegetarian Union and of the World Esperanto Association.

Life 
Christopher Fettes was born in Bromley, Kent, England and educated at Clayesmore School, Dorset, and in English and French at the University of Dublin.  He taught for a year in France and then for 37 years at Saint Columba's College, Dublin, for most of that time as a housemaster.  During that period, he revived the Irish Anti-Vivisection Society and the Esperanto Association of Ireland, became an Irish citizen in 1970, and founded the Vegetarian Society of Ireland and was Secretary of the European Vegetarian Union.

Foundation of the Green Party in Ireland 
In 1981, he initiated and chaired the founding meeting of the Ecology Party of Ireland, which later became the Irish Green Party.  He stood unsuccessfully as a Green candidate for the European Parliament in 1984. He contested the 2002 general election and the 2011 general election in the Laois–Offaly constituency.

Voluntary work 
He was a government appointee on the Central Council of the Irish Red Cross.

For many years, Fettes accompanied children to Esperanto youth and family gatherings in various European countries. From 1988 to 1996, he served as international coordinator for the International Children's Camps of the World Esperanto Association.

Later life 
In 1991, he purchased the remains of the Bloomville estate: 55 acres of land with a decaying Georgian farmhouse in County Offaly. Since he retired in 2000, this has been slowly restored, and in 2011 was highlighted by the Engage with Architecture Centre in Tullamore.  From time to time, he organizes small conferences for sections of the Green Party, The Tolkien Society, the Open Christianity Network and other bodies. The estate, where many thousands of deciduous trees have been planted and the wilder aspects preserved, is frequented by families seeking a stimulating natural environment for their children. In addition, Esperanto-speakers from as far away as Australia and Brazil, Japan and Korea are regularly provided with free accommodation.

References  

1937 births
Living people
Alumni of Trinity College Dublin
Green Party (Ireland) politicians
Irish Anglicans
Irish environmentalists
Irish Esperantists
Irish vegetarianism activists
People educated at Clayesmore School